Amrith Rohan Perera, PC (born 1947) is a Sri Lankan lawyer and diplomat, and former Permanent Representative of Sri Lanka to the United Nations since April 2015. He was a former legal adviser to the Ministry of Foreign Affairs and Chairman of the United Nations Ad Hoc Committee on Comprehensive Convention on International Terrorism. He is a current member of the International Law Commission Perera has also served as a member of the Lessons Learnt and Reconciliation Commission and adviser to the All Party Representatives Committee.

He joined the Ministry of Foreign Affairs as an assistant legal adviser. In a 32-year career Perera negotiated several bi-lateral and multilateral treaties in areas of foreign trade, investment, maritime boundary 
regimes, mutual legal assistance and extradition on behalf of the Government of Sri Lanka.

He has served as a visiting lecturer in International Law at the Faculty of Law, University of Colombo, Bandaranaike International Diplomatic Training Institute and at the General Sir John Kotelawala Defence University.  He is a member of the Editorial Board of the Manchester Journal of International Economic Law, the Law College Law Review and the Sri Lanka Journal of International Law

See also
International Law Commission
Comprehensive Convention on International Terrorism
Lessons Learnt and Reconciliation Commission

References

External links
 Lecture by Rohan Perera entitled International Legal Framework to Enhance Co-operation in Combatting International Terrorism - Contribution of the United Nations in the Lecture Series of the United Nations Audiovisual Library of International Law
 Introductory note by Rohan Perera on the Declaration on Measures to Eliminate International Terrorism and the 1996 Supplementary Declaration thereto in the Historic Archives of the United Nations Audiovisual Library of International Law
 Introductory note by Rohan Perera on the International Convention for the Suppression of Acts of Nuclear Terrorism in the Historic Archives of the United Nations Audiovisual Library of International Law

Living people
Sinhalese lawyers
Sinhalese civil servants
Sri Lankan diplomats
President's Counsels (Sri Lanka)
Academic staff of the General Sir John Kotelawala Defence University
Academic staff of the University of Colombo
International Law Commission officials
1947 births
Sri Lankan officials of the United Nations
Members of the International Law Commission